The Wedge was an Australian sketch show created by Ian McFadyen and produced by Cornerbox for Network Ten. The show stars Dailan Evans, from the ABC sketch show Eagle & Evans; Adam Zwar, best known for his roles in Wilfred, Rebel Wilson, who at the time was best known as 'Toula' on the comedy show Pizza; Jason Gann, two-time winner of best actor at Tropfest for his roles in Wilfred, as well as regulars Kate Jenkinson, Anthony Ahern, Katrina Mathers, Julie Eckersley and Ross Daniels. Marney McQueen, Aidan Fennessy and Cori Hooper were also regulars in Series 1, and Damian Callinan and Cal Wilson were regulars in Series 2.

It ran for two seasons, airing 2006 and 2007. A spin-off mockumentary of one of the show's characters, Mark Wary, was produced by Network Ten in 2008. The show, titled Mark Loves Sharon premiered at 9:30pm on 30 June 2008.

History and premise
The program was first advertised by Network Ten in December 2005, with promos depicting Wedgedale, a stereotypical Australian urban sprawl suburb. The show’s pilot debuted on Network Ten on 30 May 2006. It is a sketch based format similar to Fast Forward or The Comedy Company. The difference is that nearly all the sketches take place in the same town, so the transition from sketch to sketch often involves a reference to the previous one. Most transitions involve a timelapse shot that takes the audience from one location to another, but sometimes the reference is more direct and seamless. This is used so often, that a sketch based on it was made. In one episode, the character, Sandra Sultry said "Next up, I'll turn my head to the TV behind me; it's a clever transitional device which will put you through to the next item..."The first season finale was broadcast on 21 November 2006. "Sounds Funny" is the show's theme.  Hunter Kaine was recommended as the singer by a production team member's friend. 

A second series was commissioned by Network Ten; production began in September, and was filmed in South Melbourne. The second season's status was updated by a news bulletin posted on its official website, which was advertising for a live taping with an audience. The second season was broadcast on Network Ten in 2007.

The second season was first hinted on Network Ten in 2007 promoting a Mother Energy drink, featuring the character, Sandra Sultry (played by Katrina Mathers) and unknown voice actor as a frog. Along the bottom of the screen scrolled a web address for the Mother energy drink.

The official website was relaunched with new information on the second series on 10 August.

The second season began on 12 August 2007, with two episodes screened back to back with the new rating of 'M' at 9:40 PM. However, from 19 August onwards, the timeslot was inconsistent from week to week. The season took a break for almost a month and was continued at the later time of 10.25 PM on 16 September with a single episode airing. It was dropped from the timeslot was once again due to the Rugby World Cup.  Despite such movements from Network Ten, the show retained a much more popular feedback than its first season and has been having consistent ratings of around 500,000 viewers per episode. On 26 October the show returned with a 10:30 PM timeslot, and was not renewed for a third season.

Cast and crew

Season 1
Cast

Crew

Season 2
Cast

Crew

Characters and sketches

DVD releases

¹The 20th episode of season one was repeated in the That's Valid and Thanks for Coming DVDs.

Episode guide

Critical reception
The Wedge had mixed success with audiences and critics during its first season. The ratings for the first season were initially strong, with the first episode receiving 1.5 million viewers and later episodes averaging over one million viewers. The shows recent popularity waned nearer the end of the first season, with episodes reaching a much smaller audience (681,000 viewers for the episode that aired on 21 November 2006). Despite the show's first season initially receiving high ratings, it was criticised by some TV reviewers. Issue was taken with the perceived over-use of canned laughter and what they considered to be poorly written, dated, cheap humour that attacked easy targets and propagated offensive stereotypes. Shortly after the series debuted, Catherine Deveny, one of the writers, wrote an article for The Age in which she revealed that the producers had insisted on re-writing and blanding out the scripts in the hope of appealing to a wider audience, but maintained that the writers and performers were themselves talented comics.

Although the show had its share of negative reviews, critics from Famous magazine quoted that it had "Some of the most outrageous, loopy, and colourful residents God ever put on this world", while Sean Fewster from the Adelaide Advertiser remarked that "This could well be the first truly great ensemble of the 21st Century" and "The Wedge is a near perfect blending of The Comedy Company's family-friendly, occasionally bizarre jokes and Fast Forward's nasty, satirical edge.... Ladies and gentlemen, welcome back to Australian sketch comedy".  Sean Lynch remarked that "We may very well look back on this...as the beginning of one of Australia's greatest comedy shows of the new millennium", Neil Mitchell from 3AW remarked that the show was "one of the freshest things on TV" and a writer from newspaper The Age said "Such a rich vein of comedy, you can't help wonder why someone hasn't mined it sooner". Memorable TV remarked "At last we have a comedy sketch show worthy of the mantle of Fast Forward and Full Frontal. Very funny." shortly after the release of the DVDs. The show's second season had a much more popular feedback from audiences during its second season, hence reflecting from its consistent ratings at its 'dead-zone' timeslot. The Age, who had panned the show's previous season remarked, "... (The Wedge) delivers enough flashes of brilliance to confirm it's on the right track".

British television and radio presenter Jonathan Ross recently reviewed it on his film 2009 show, in which he condemned it saying "it tries to hard to follow the much better British alternatives and fails badly" in which he added "not one to watch".

Side projects
 Karingal Park Secondary College won a competition called "Art Cooney Comes to Your School" that was first advertised on The Wedge website.  As a part of the prize, the school received a visit from Adam Zwar, portraying the character Art Cooney. Another competition to get on set of 'The Wedge' was set, winners were invited onto the set for a tour.
 The Wedge characters Mark Wary (Jason Gann) and his manager (Dailan Evans) made an appearance on the 50 Years of Comic Relief show broadcast on Seven Network. In addition to this, Russell Gilbert, Kate Jenkinson and Rebel Wilson also made an appearance on the show.
 Cal Wilson, Dailan Evans and Kate Jenkinson have made an appearance on Australia's improvisation show, Thank God You're Here during its second season. Rebel Wilson has also made appearances on the third season of Thank God You're Here (as well as Kate Jenkinson's second appearance).

References

External links

 
 The Wedge on Australian Television

Network 10 original programming
Australian television sketch shows
2006 Australian television series debuts
2007 Australian television series endings
English-language television shows